The DiSTI Corporation is a company that provides software tools for the development of GUI software and 3D virtual training for simulators and embedded systems.

Company 

DiSTI concentrates its business on innovating software to produce high fidelity 2D and 3D graphical user interfaces to aid in the creation of simulated training, prototyping, and deployment of embedded systems. Their software is often used in the development for Virtual Maintenance Training systems, desktop trainers, as well as embedded avionics, automotive, and medical devices.

Their cornerstone product is the GL Studio Toolkit, which has been implemented in the development of the embedded avionics for Scaled Composites and Virgin Galactic's commercial spacecraft: the VSS Enterprise and VMS Eve.

History 

DiSTI was formed by Joe Swinski, Darren Humphrey, and William (Bill) Andrews in 1994 in Orlando, Florida.

Swinski, Humphrey, and Andrews met while working together at the Institute for Simulation and Training (IST) at the University of Central Florida in Orlando, FL. At IST, Swinski, Humphrey, and Andrews were aiding in the development of simulation training classes for graduate students, but they saw an opportunity to give the simulation and training industry the same type of training.

It was under a SBIR (Small Business Innovation Research) contract, completed June 24, 2000, that DiSTI developed the GL Studio toolkit. DiSTI now makes software that help developers create virtual training environments to teach technical, complex activities such as maintenance on airplanes, engines and power plants. DiSTI's patented software also creates human-machine interfaces such as dashboards, gauges, and control screens.

DiSTI technologies are used by companies worldwide, including Boeing, Lockheed Martin, Honeywell, Raytheon, Thales Group, BAE Systems, Dassault Group, among many others.

In July 2020, DiSTI Corporation reported that John Hayward has been named as Chief Executive Officer by the Company's board of directors. Hayward, an accomplished teaching and simulation leader, would offer his extensive expertise and powerful leadership to speed up the development of DiSTI.

Products 
In 2011, DiSTI changed their product offering. They introduced their latest interactive software application, Replic8 and re-organized their GL Studio offering to introduce a new toolkit that streamlines the creation of interfaces for enhanced embedded applications. This introduction became a part of DiSTI's repackaging move in order to more closely match different global vertical market demands.

 Replic8: a tool that merges the design and development phases of an Instructional Design process. It is an out-of-th-box 3D lesson framework that integrates into any extendible learning management system. It allows Instructional Designers, Subject Matter Experts, or 3D Graphic Artists to easily produce 3D interactive level 3 and 4 courseware without programming.
 GL Studio (Basic): a suite of tools that enable developers to build high fidelity graphics and fully interactive controls into their software products.  In 2019, GL Studio 6.3 was released. 
 GL Studio DT (Desktop): a toolkit that offers essential features to developing high fidelity desktop graphical applications to develop desktop based interfaces.
 GL Studio ES (Embedded Systems): one tool that takes the developer from prototyping, to testing, to embedded system deployment through a single code base
 GL Studio SC (Safety Critical): the tool for safety critical systems and the recognized industry standard for the rapid prototyping of safety critical Human Machine Interfaces (HMI).
 DiSTI Map Toolkit: Allows for the development of real-time moving map display applications. It provides the capability to combine multiple geo-referenced map imagery formats and user defined symbology across multiple layers to produce a single real-time 2D map view
 Data Director Toolkit: For the Human Factors and Prototyping communities, this toolkit connects multiple data sources, such as math models or simulation data, to user interface objects with no programming
 Approach Plate Toolkit: This plug-in converts digital Instrument Approach Procedures (IAP) charts into correlated geo-referenced GL Studio objects suitable for a variety of aeronautical based applications.
 Pre-Built Content: A variety of complete turnkey photo-realistic virtual cockpits. A partial list of pre-built cockpits includes: A-10, E-6, CH-47, F-15, F-16, F-18, OH-58, TH-57, AH-64, HH/MH/SH/UH-60, Piper Malibu, T-39, T-45, HEMTT, HMMWV, LMTV, LCAC
 RSO bundles: pre-built reusable software objects (RSOs) include the appearance and behavior of the object coupled with a well defined interface.

References

Software companies based in Florida
Companies based in Orlando, Florida
Virtual reality companies
Virtual reality organizations
Software companies of the United States